The 2010 BWF World Championships was the 18th tournament of the World Badminton Championships. It was held at Stade Pierre de Coubertin in Paris, France, from August 23 to August 29, 2010. Following the results of the mixed doubles.

Seeds

 Nova Widianto / Lilyana Natsir (quarterfinals)
 Thomas Laybourn / Kamilla Rytter Juhl (quarterfinals)
 Robert Mateusiak / Nadieżda Kostiuczyk (second round)
 Hendra Aprida Gunawan / Vita Marissa (third round)
 Joachim Fischer Nielsen / Christinna Pedersen (third round)
 He Hanbin / Yu Yang (finalists)
 Lee Yong-dae / Lee Hyo-jung (third round)
 Zheng Bo / Ma Jin (champions)
 Valiyaveetil Diju / Jwala Gutta (quarterfinals)
 Tao Jiaming / Zhang Yawen (quarterfinals)
 Chen Hung-ling / Chou Chia-chi (second round)
 Ko Sung-hyun / Ha Jung-eun (semifinals)
 Songphon Anugritayawon / Kunchala Voravichitchaikul (third round)
 Sudket Prapakamol / Saralee Thungthongkam (third round)
 Nathan Robertson / Jenny Wallwork (third round)
 Lee Sheng-mu / Chien Yu-chin (semifinals)

Main stage

Section 1

Section 2

Section 3

Section 4

Final stage

External links
Official website
tournamentsoftware.com

2010 BWF World Championships
World Championships